The Portland Pickles are a collegiate woodbat baseball team based in Portland, Oregon. They play in the South Division of the West Coast League, a premier collegiate summer baseball league based in the Pacific Northwest and British Columbia. The Pickles play their home games at Walker Stadium in Portland's Lents Park.

History

Team Naming (2015) 

On April 21, 2015, team officials announced the team's name at Woodstock Elementary School in Southeast Portland. The name was selected by online voting from six candidates. In order of vote, Pickles was followed by Mud Hounds, Red Dogs, Posse, Pliers, and Pixels.

Great West League (2015–2017)
The Pickles were charter members of the Great West League, having been founded in 2015 by GWL commissioner Ken Wilson. The Pickles (claimed to have) played before 16 sell-outs and to 99% of capacity in their inaugural 2016 season (announced figures). A month before their second season on April 5, 2017, it was announced that Seattle Seahawks punter Jon Ryan and marketing entrepreneur Alan Miller would become part of the Pickles ownership group, along with members from Rose City Baseball LLC. Former Major League Baseball pitcher and Oregon-native Jeff Lahti took over the managerial role for the 2017 season, and the Pickles were eliminated from the Great West League playoffs by the Medford Rogues.

West Coast League (2018–present)
On October 24, 2017, the Pickles announced that they were leaving the GWL and joining the West Coast League. Prior to the 2018 season, Gresham GreyWolves head coach Justin Barchus replaced Lahti as manager. His team won the South Division in the first half of the season with a 17–9 record, securing them a playoff spot in their first year. The Pickles went on to claim the best record in the WCL by going 37–17 overall, but could not get past the Corvallis Knights in the first round of playoffs. Justin Barchus went on to win WCL Coach of the Year along with Kelowna Falcons manager Brain Donohue.

Wild Wild West League (2020)
On June 5, 2020, the West Coast League board of directors voted to cancel the 2020 season due to COVID-19 pandemic. The Pickles organization founded the Wild Wild West League in response, playing in Bob Brack Stadium at North Marion High School in Aurora, Oregon. The league consisted of four teams: the Pickles, Portland Gherkins, Gresham GreyWolves, and West Linn Knights.  The Gherkins were founded as a farm team for the Pickles and were to play an independent schedule prior to the pandemic.  The team plays fellow teams in the WCL including the Pickles with Gherkin players given the opportunity to move up to the Pickles roster based on ability.  Games ran from July 11 to August 7 with playoffs on August 8 and a final championship game on August 9. The West Linn Knights took on the Portland Pickles in the championship and took the title in a close match up, winning 8–7.

After only one season in the WWWL, the Pickles would return to the WCL full-time in 2021 while the WWWL moved on with two new teams, the Portland Rosebuds and Willamette Wild Bills, also owned by the Pickles organization.

CBD sponsorship
On May 15, 2019, the Portland Pickles announced a two-year-long sponsorship with Lazarus Naturals. The deal with the Portland-based CBD (Cannabidiol) company acted as the very first deal of its kind in Baseball history. Along with this, Lazarus Naturals sponsored a concert series at the Pickles ballpark, Walker Stadium.

The sponsorship also took shape in the form of the Lazarus Naturals Veterans at The Park Program which allows for local veterans to be submitted for special tickets in the Lazarus Naturals Patriot Box at Walker Stadium.

Relationship with the Venados
On October 9, 2019, the Portland Pickles faced off against the Mazatlan Venados in a friendly exhibition game in front of 16,000 people. In the lead up to the game, the Pickles held tryouts amongst fans in Portland for the chance to travel with the team to Mexico and play in the game. There is currently a documentary on the game in the works that is slated to be released soon.

Mascot Theft Incident
In 2022, the mascot costume for Dillon T. Pickle was stolen after delivery in a case of package theft. The team had been playing in the Dominican Republic and the luggage containing the mascot costume was separated from the team. After being found by the airline it was shipped to the wrong house in Portland and subsequently stolen off the front porch in an act of package theft by an unknown party. It was eventually dropped off at Voodoo Doughnut by a person wishing to remain anonymous. The incident attracted the attention of some national media, who covered the saga in a bemused fashion.

Results by season

All-Star Game selections

Broadcast
Pickles games are broadcast on Facebook Live and YouTube with play-by-play announcers changing year to year. In 2020, Judah Newby of radio show 750 THE GAME did play by play. In the most recent 2021 season, Ben Creighton, the voice of Pac-12 baseball took over play-by-play duties. Joined in the press box by broadcast director, John Sandilands, productions manager, Ian Mathes, director of baseball operations and analytics, Colin Hardy, and official scorekeeper, Gary Walker, the Pickles have been lauded for the quality of broadcasts and overall operations. Introduced during the 2021 season, "Pickles after Dark", which is enacted infrequently, perfectly encapsulates the fun-loving, non-traditional environment in which Portland baseball fans embrace.

The Wild Wild West League announcer was Carlo Jimenez for the 2020 season, and Mike Chexx for the 2021 season.

Notes

References

General
 "The Pickles Are Portland's Best Baseball-Playing Orphans" in  Willamette Week
 New Pickles owner trades gridiron for baseball diamond from Fox 12
 Jon Ryan, Alan Miller Join Pickles Ownership Group from Baseball Digest 
 Seahawks punter Jon Ryan wants to build a baseball empire from The Seattle Times

External links
 Portland Pickles official website

2015 establishments in Oregon
Amateur baseball teams in Oregon
Baseball in Portland, Oregon
Sports teams in Portland, Oregon
Baseball teams established in 2015